Ali Yusuf Ali is an Indian politician and a member of the  16th Legislative Assembly of Uttar Pradesh of India. He represents the Chamraua  constituency of Uttar Pradesh and is a member of the Bahujan Samaj Party political party.

Early life and education

Ali Yusuf Ali was born in  Rampur district. He attended the Choudary Jamuna Das Inter College and  attained twelfth grade degree.

Political career

Ali Yusuf Ali has been a  MLA for one term. He represented the Chamraua constituency and is a member of the Bahujan Samaj Party political party.

He lost his seat in the 2017 Uttar Pradesh Assembly election to Naseer Ahmed Khan of the Samajwadi Party.

Posts held

See also
Chamraua
Sixteenth Legislative Assembly of Uttar Pradesh
Uttar Pradesh Legislative Assembly

References 

Bahujan Samaj Party politicians from Uttar Pradesh
Uttar Pradesh MLAs 2012–2017
People from Rampur district
1976 births
Living people
Indian National Congress politicians